"Temptation" is the fourth single by American singer-songwriter Corina. Written by Carlos Berrios, Corina, Franc Reyes, and Luis Capri Duprey, the single was released by Cutting Records/Atco Records on April 8, 1991, as the lead single of her self-titled debut album. It was her biggest hit, peaking at number 6 on the U.S. Billboard Hot 100 chart.

Track listing

Personnel
 Corina – lead and backing vocals
 Carlos Berrios – keyboards, bass, drums

Charts

Weekly charts

Year-end charts

References

External links
 
 

1991 singles
1991 songs
Corina (singer) songs
Atco Records singles